A patent model was a handmade miniature model no larger than 12" by 12" by 12" (approximately 30 cm by 30 cm by 30 cm) that showed how an invention works. It was one of the most interesting early features of the United States patent system.

Since some early inventors had little technological or legal training, it was difficult for them to submit formal patent applications which require the novel features of an invention to be described in a written application and a number of diagrams.

History 

In the US, patent models were required from 1790 to 1880.  The United States Congress abolished the legal requirement for them in 1870, but the U.S. Patent Office (USPTO) kept the requirement until 1880.

On July 31, 1790 inventor Samuel Hopkins of Pittsford, Vermont became the first person to be issued a patent in the United States. His patented invention was an improvement in the "making of Pot Ash by a new apparatus & process." These earliest patent law required that a working model of each invention be produced in miniature.

Some inventors still willingly submitted models at the turn of the twentieth century. In some cases, an inventor may still want to present a "working model" as an evidence to prove actual reduction to practice in an interference proceeding. In some jurisdictions patent models stayed an aid to demonstrate the operation of the invention.  In applications involving genetics, samples of genetic material or DNA sequences may be required.

United States Patent Office's collection of models 

The United States Patent Office used to publicly display the models of approved patents.   This collection of models suffered two major fires- one in 1836, and another in 1877.  The 1877 fire destroyed 75,000 patent models.

In 1908, the Patent Office donated just over 1,000 patent models to United States National Museum. The remaining models were packed and moved several times before Congress chose to dissolve the collection in 1926. The Smithsonian Institution was allowed to choose first from the remaining models; accessions from the Patent Office now form part of the collection of over 10,000 patent models at the National Museum of American History.

Many models were sold off by the patent office in 1925 and were purchased by Sir Henry Wellcome, the founder of the Burroughs-Wellcome Company (now part of GlaxoSmithKline).   Although he intended to establish a patent model museum, the stock market crash of 1929 damaged his fortune; the models were left in storage.   After his death, the collection went through a number of ownership changes; a large portion of the collection—along with $1,000,000—was donated to the nonprofit United States Patent Model Foundation by Cliff Peterson.  Rather than being put into a museum, these models were slowly sold off by the foundation.   Much legal wrangling, purchasing, and re-selling ensued.  A comparatively small number of models (4,000) were the property of the Rothschild Patent Museum until 2015, when they were transferred to Hagley Museum and Library, forming a part of the museum's collection of patent models. With over 5,000 models, the Hagley's is the largest private collection, and second in size only to the Smithsonian's.

See also 
 United States Patent and Trademark Office
 Patent drawing
 1836 U.S. Patent Office fire
 1877 U.S. Patent Office fire

References

Further reading 
 Hughes, Debra K., Martin W. Kane, and Charles A. Foote. Artifacts of invention: Patent models at the Hagley Museum and Library. York, Pa: York Graphic Services, 1993.
 Janssen, Barbara Suit. Patent Models Index: Guide to the Collections of the National Museum of American History, Smithsonian Institution. Smithsonian Contributions to History and Technology, no. 54. Washington, D.C.: Smithsonian Institution Scholarly Press, 2010. (A complete, full-color, 2-volume index of the more than 10,000 original patent models now housed in the collections of the Smithsonian's National Museum of American History.)
 Rothschild, Alan, and Ann Rothschild. Inventing a Better Mousetrap: 200 Years of American History in the Amazing World of Patent Models. 2015.

External links 

 The Rothschild Petersen Patent Model Museum
 The patent model of Alexander Graham Bell's No. 174,465 invention
 Patent model windmill c.1860-70
 Press release by Hagley Museum and Library
 Hagley Museum and Library's online database of museum objects

Model, patent
History of patent law